Garsenda, Garsende, or Gersenda is a feminine given name, popular in the Middle Ages. It was the name of:
Garsenda, Countess of Forcalquier, also countess of Provence and a trobairitz
her mother, Garsenda of Forcalquier
her daughter, Garsenda of Provence, Viscountess of Béarn
Garsenda of Toulouse
Garsende of Béziers and Agde
Gersende of Bigorre